Kirkville is an unincorporated community in Tangipahoa Parish, Louisiana, United States. The community is located   S of Osyka, Mississippi and  N of Amite City, Louisiana

History
As German immigrants arrived at New Orleans they settled in Osyka, Mississippi and overflowed south into Louisiana. The land across the Louisiana state line was not a part of Mississippi and could not be called Osyka. The community took the name Kirkville and is named after Lawrence Alexander Kirk, a railroad surveyor that owned a large portion of the land.

References

Unincorporated communities in Tangipahoa Parish, Louisiana
Unincorporated communities in Louisiana